Lord Richard Cavendish (19 June 1752 – 7 September 1781) was an English nobleman and politician. He was the second son of William Cavendish, 4th Duke of Devonshire and his wife, Charlotte.

Cavendish was educated in Hackney and at Trinity College, Cambridge.

In 1773, he entered the House of Commons as MP for Lancaster after winning a by-election on 15 September following the death of the incumbent Francis Reynolds.  At this time, he moved to No. 1 Savile Row, London, where he resided until 1781. He was one of the few attendees at his brother Devonshire's wedding in 1774. In 1778 and 1779, he served with the navy as a gentleman volunteer. In 1781, he went abroad in hopes of recovering his failing health; but he continued to decline and died unmarried in Naples.

References

1752 births
1781 deaths
Younger sons of dukes
Younger sons of barons
Children of prime ministers of the United Kingdom
Members of the Parliament of Great Britain for English constituencies
British MPs 1768–1774
British MPs 1774–1780
British MPs 1780–1784
Richard Cavendish
Alumni of Trinity College, Cambridge